The Podsosenka train disaster happened on March 3, 1992 at 5:15 (local time) near Nelidovo, Tver Oblast in Russia.

Passenger train No. 004 en route from Riga to Moscow failed to stop at restrictive signal, and collided with an oncoming freight train No. 3455 at station Podsosenka. The collision of the two diesel locomotives caused a fire, which spread to the passenger cars. 43 people were killed, and 108 injured.

Notes 

Railway accidents in 1992
Train collisions in Russia
Rail transport in Tver Oblast
1992 disasters in Russia
Train and rapid transit fires
1992 fires in Europe
Fires in Russia
Railway accidents involving a signal passed at danger
Accidents and incidents involving Russian Railways
March 1992 events in Europe